Love Monkey is a comic novel by Kyle Smith published in 2004. It is the basis for the 2006 CBS television series of the same name. Love Monkey is Kyle Smith's first novel.  Smith is currently a film critic for the New York Post.

Plot summary
Tom Farrell is a man in his thirties who resides in New York City in 2001 (before, during and after the September 11 attacks). The novel is a slice of life story, briefly visiting several months of his life as he works as an editor of the weekend edition of the New York City newspaper, Tabloid. Although his friends and relatives advance in life (marriage, kids, etc.), Tom believes he is not. He makes around $86,000 a year, but the most expensive item he owns is a several thousand dollar couch (doesn't own a high priced item like a home or car, for example). The novel tracks Tom as he moves through his life, with each chapter being a day in his life during the year 2001 (not all days covered, and not all chapters start new days).

Throughout the book, Tom dates several women, including the woman he really fancies, Julia. Unfortunately for him, Julia is living with another man, and is ten years his junior in age. Julia also works at Tabloid, but while Tom is an editor, Julia is just starting out.

Tom's days are filled with drinking, watching TV (many cartoons), working at Tabloid, and trying to deal with his deep desire to be in a relationship with Julia, who seems somewhat determined to not have said relationship.

On his ride through 2001, Tom interacts with some of his friends, including Bran, Karen & Mike, Rollo, and Shooter (among others).

Characters
Tom Farrell: Narrator and star of the novel, Tom is a man of relatively average height who describes himself as having the shape of a bowling pin (pudgy, fat, overweight), who also happens to have long hair.  Tom works as the editor for the weekend edition of the NYC newspaper Tabloid.  Tom has worked the majority of his professional career at this newspaper. His friends include: his default date Bran, who is something of a female friend, though the relationship is undetermined; Karen & Mike, the married couple (and unlike in the TV series, Karen is not his sister); Shooter, the tall, powerful, rich, ladies man, who is black.  Tom is from Maryland, and his Missouri-bred mother still lives in Maryland as a dental hygienist.

Brandy 'Bran' Lowenstein:  Bran works as a producer for a television news program, is Jewish, and is the “default” date for Tom.  They tend to like each other, but not really in a romantic way.

Karen & Mike: Are Tom's married friends.

Katie/Kate/Katherine: Tom's law-student girlfriend, who is increasingly talking in lawyer speak, and whose personality shifts from tarot card reading Katie, to extremely serious Katherine as she moves through law-school.

Julia: Julia is the young new copygirl at Tabloid, and the woman that Tom cannot seem to get move past, or to get her to enter into a serious relationship with him.

Liesl: Another of Tom's girlfriend's, Liesl is of German descent and works for a legal organization that represents the high-profile terrorist, murder/serial killer type clients (like the terrorists who bombed the parking garage at the World Trade Center).

Shooter:  Shooter comes from a very wealthy family, and briefly worked for his father's company.  Due to some poor decisions, the father decided that it would be easier for all involved if Shooter would be given a sum of money and told to spend his life spending it.  Shooter has some very strong feelings about women, and never has a problem finding a woman to spend some time with.  There was one woman, though, that really got to him, and might have warped his mind.

Rollo: Respected veteran journalist, Rollo now spends his time as the movie reviewer at Tabloid, with Tom as his editor (and sometimes writer of the reviews).  Well, mostly he spends his time drifting around bars getting drunk.

Allusions and references

To other works
Several Bob Dylan songs, including "Idiot Wind", "If You See Her Say Hello", "Simple Twist of Fate", and "You're Gonna Make Me Lonesome When You Go", and numerous other musical works are mentioned in this book (including Train's "Drops of Jupiter (Tell Me)", and Pink Floyd's The Wall). Tom writes a review for David McCullough's book John Adams.

To actual history, geography and current science
The events that occurred during the attacks on September 11, 2001 are mentioned and witnessed by the characters in the book.

Literary significance & criticism

Reviews

Release details
2004, Hardcover, USA, William Morrow, February 2004, 
2005, Paperback, USA, Harper Perennial, 1 February 2005, 

2004 American novels
American comedy novels
Novels set in New York City
Fiction set in 2001
2004 debut novels
American novels adapted into television shows